Hilda Melander (born 1 December 1991) is a Swedish former tennis player.

In her career, she won three singles titles and nine doubles titles on the ITF Women's Circuit. On 8 September 2014, she reached her best singles ranking of world No. 311. On 10 November 2014, she peaked at No. 224 in the WTA doubles rankings.

Melander made her debut for Sweden Fed Cup team in February 2012. In Fed Cup competitions, she has a win–loss record of 2–2.

ITF finals

Singles (3–4)

Doubles (9–8)

References

External links
 
 
 

1991 births
Living people
Tennis players from Stockholm
Swedish female tennis players
20th-century Swedish women
21st-century Swedish women